Javier 'Javi' Rodríguez Venta (born 13 December 1975) is a Spanish retired professional footballer who played as a right-back.

He amassed La Liga totals of 270 matches and two goals over 11 seasons, mainly with Villarreal (eight years). He also appeared in the competition with Tenerife and Levante, and had a brief abroad spell in England with Brentford.

Career

Early years
Venta was born in Pola de Siero, Asturias. After playing his early career with modest Spanish clubs he was bought in 1999 by Villarreal CF, but would spend the next three seasons with the farm team (CD Onda) and on loan stints.

He made his La Liga debut in the latter predicament in the 2001–02 season, playing 29 league games for CD Tenerife who ranked second-bottom.

Villarreal and Levante
In 2002–03, Venta returned to Villarreal and went on to become a steady first-choice throughout the season. In the 2004–05 campaign he appeared in 32 matches as the Valencian side achieved a club-high third place; he was subsequently named by Spain manager Luis Aragonés in his provisional 27-man squad for the 2006 FIFA World Cup, but he did not make the final cut.

In late April 2010, it was announced that both the 34-year-old Venta and Robert Pires would be leaving Villarreal. During three years he constantly fought for first-choice status with Ángel López, with both appearing in roughly the same number of games. In late August he signed for one year with Levante UD, returned to the top division after a two-year absence.

Venta started in 25 of his 26 appearances in his second season, totalling 2,224 minutes of action as Levante finished sixth and qualified to the UEFA Europa League for the first time in its history. He did not have an offer to renew his expiring contract, however, and returned to Villarreal for a second stint.

Brentford
On 11 July 2013, aged 37, Venta moved abroad for the first time in his career, joining Football League One club Brentford on a one-year deal with an option to extend to a second season depending on appearances. He scored his only goal for the club in a 5–3 win against AFC Wimbledon in that season's Football League Trophy on 3 September, which also marked his fourth and final overall appearance; he had his contract terminated by mutual consent on the 30th, and returned to Spain for personal reasons.

Honours
Villarreal
UEFA Intertoto Cup: 2003, 2004

References

External links

1975 births
Living people
People from Siero
Spanish footballers
Footballers from Asturias
Association football defenders
La Liga players
Segunda División players
Segunda División B players
Tercera División players
Real Oviedo Vetusta players
Marino de Luanco footballers
Gimnástica de Torrelavega footballers
Villarreal CF players
Racing de Ferrol footballers
CD Tenerife players
Levante UD footballers
English Football League players
Brentford F.C. players
Spanish expatriate footballers
Expatriate footballers in England
Spanish expatriate sportspeople in England